The 1977 New York Cosmos season was the seventh season for the New York Cosmos in the now-defunct North American Soccer League. The Cosmos' seventh year of existence saw them drop "New York" from the club name (it would be restored in 1979), move into Giants Stadium (where they would play until their dissolution in 1985), and win their second NASL championship in Pelé's final year as a professional footballer. Pelé's last match was on October 1, 1977, in front of a capacity crowd at Giants Stadium: in an exhibition match between New York and his former club Santos, Pelé appeared for both sides, playing one half for each. The Cosmos won the game 2–1. The Cosmos finished second in the 4-team Eastern Division and third out of 18 teams league-wide on their way to the 1977 championship.

Squad 

 

Source:

Results 
Source:

Friendlies

Preseason

Regular season 
Pld = Games Played, W = Wins, L = Losses, GF = Goals For, GA = Goals Against, Pts = Points
6 points for a win, 1 point for a shootout win, 0 points for a loss, 1 point for each goal scored (up to three per game).

Eastern Division Standings

Overall League Placing 

Source:

Matches

Postseason

Overview

First round

Conference semifinals

Conference Championships

Soccer Bowl '77

Matches

References

See also
1977 North American Soccer League season
List of New York Cosmos seasons

Cosmos
New York Cosmos seasons
New York Cosmos
Cosmos
1977
Soccer Bowl champion seasons